Asik may refer to:

 Aşik, a singer who accompanied his song with a lute in Azerbaijani and related Turkic cultures
 Aşık, a Turkish-language name

See also 
 T’asik, a village and rural community in the Syunik Province of Armenia